The following is a partial list of National Football League players whose fathers also played professional football in the NFL or any league that merged with it.  The list includes the son's name and position and the father's name and position.

Key

List of players

Second–generation

Third–generation

See also
List of second-generation National Basketball Association players
List of second-generation Major League Baseball players

External links
Fathers and Sons Who Have Played Pro Football from profootbalhof.com

second generation